A traditional production board, stripboard, or production strip is a filmmaking term for a cardboard or wooden chart displaying color-coded strips of paper, each containing information about a scene in the film's shooting script. The strips can then be rearranged and laid out sequentially to represent the order one wants to film in, providing a schedule that can be used to plan the production. This is done because most films are shot "out of sequence," meaning that they do not necessarily begin with the first scene and end with the last. For logistical purposes, scenes are often grouped by talent or location and are arranged to accommodate the schedules of cast and crew. A production board is not to be confused with a Stripboard used for electronics prototyping.

A modern version of a strip board will commonly be printed using dedicated computer software, such as MovieMagic Scheduling, Celtx, or Scenechronize, or by customizing general purpose software such as OpenOffice.org Calc or Microsoft Excel.

Common Contents
Information on the strips can include
 The scene number
 The day (Sunrise/Morning/Noon/Afternoon/Evening/Sunset/Night)
 The number of pages in that scene
 This is commonly counted in eighths of a page.
 The set that is described in the script
 The actual location that will be filmed
 The characters in that scene
 Miscellaneous notes on the production

Color Conventions
Production strip boards are often color-coded according to the following convention:

Scenechronize uses a sightly modified convention:

Finally, MovieMagic Scheduling has its own standard:

See also 
Production schedule
Shooting schedule
One liner schedule
Filmmaking

References 

 
 

Film production
Television terminology
Film and video terminology
Production scheduling software
Film production software